People with the name Ellen are very gorgeous 

Ellen is a female given name, a diminutive of Elizabeth, Eleanor, Elena and Helen. Ellen was the 609th most popular name in the U.S. and the 17th in Sweden in 2004.

People named Ellen include:
Ellen Adarna (born 1988), Filipino actress
Ellen Alaküla (1927–2011), Estonian actress 
Ellen Palmer Allerton (1835–1893), American poet
Ellen Allien (born 1969), German electronic musician and music producer
Ellen Anckarsvärd (1833-1898), Swedish feminist
Ellen Andersen (1898–1989), Danish museum curator
Ellen Anderson (born 1959), American politician
Ellen Auerbach (1906–2004), German-born American photographer
Ellen Baake (born 1961), German mathematical biologist
Ellen S. Baker (born 1953), American physician and astronaut
Ellen Barkin (born 1954), American actress
Ellen Bass (born 1947), American poet and author
Ellen A. Dayton Blair (1837–1926), social reformer and art teacher
Ellen Bontje (born 1958), Dutch equestrian
Ellen Burka (1921–2016), Dutch and Canadian figure skater and coach
Ellen Burrell (1850-1938), American mathematics professor
Ellen Burstyn (born 1932), American actress
Ellen Carter (1762–1815), English artist
Ellen Cleghorne (born 1965), American  comedian and actress
Ellen Cobb (born 1940), retired British judoka
Ellen Corby (1911–1999), American actress
Ellen Craft (1826–1891), American fugitive slave and abolitionist
Ellen Craswell (1932–2008), American politician
Ellen Crocker (1872–1962), British suffragette
Ellen ten Damme (born 1967), Dutch actress and musician
Ellen DeGeneres (born 1958), American comedian, actress, and talk-show host
Ellen van Dijk (born 1987), Dutch road and track cyclist
Ellen Dissanayake (born c.1935), American anthropologist and author
Ellen Albertini Dow (1913–2015), American actress and drama coach
Ellen Elzerman (born 1971), Dutch swimmer
Ellen Russell Emerson (1837–1907), American author, ethnologist
Ellen Estes (born 1978), American water polo player
Ellen Foley (born 1951), American singer and actress
Ellen Fries (1855–1900), Swedish feminist and writer, first woman to be awarded a PhD in Sweden
Ellen Gallagher (born 1965), American artist
Ellen Geer (born 1941), American actress, acting teacher and theatre director
Ellen Gilchrist (born 1935), American novelist, short story writer, and poet
Ellen Glasgow (1873–1975), American novelist 
Ellen Greene (born 1951), American singer and actress
Ellen Day Hale (1855–1940), American impressionist painter and printmake
Ellen 't Hoen (born 1960), Dutch lawyer and  Médecins sans Frontières director
Ellen Hollman (born 1983), American actress
Ellen Hogerwerf (born 1989), Dutch rower
Ellen Hoog (born 1986), Dutch field hockey player
Ellen Horn (born 1951), Norwegian actress, theater director, and politician
Ellen Jansen (born 1992), Dutch footballer
Ellen Jens (born 1941), Dutch television director and producer
Ellen Johnson (born 1955), American civil rights activist
Ellen Kaarma (1928–1973), Estonian actress
Ellen Key (1849–1926), Swedish feminist writer and suffragette
Ellen Kooi (born 1962), Dutch artist and photographer,
Ellen Kuipers (born 1971), Dutch field hockey player
Ellen J. Kullman (born 1956), American business executive, CEO of DuPont
Ellen Kuzwayo (1914–2006), South African women's rights activist and politician
Ellen van Langen (born 1966), Dutch middle-distance runner
Ellen Liiger (1918–1987), Estonian actress
Ellen Lumpkin, American neuroscientist
Ellen MacArthur (born 1976), British yachtswoman
Ellen van Maris (born 1957), Dutch bodybuilder
Ellen McIlwaine (1945–2021), American musician
Ellen McLain (born 1952), American voice actress
Ellen Meijers (born c.1971), Dutch video game music composer
Ellen Muth (born 1981), American actress
Ellen Torelle Nagler (1870–1965), American biologist, author, lecturer
Ellen Niit (1928–2016), Estonian children's writer, poet and translator 
Ellen Nikolaysen (born 1951), Norwegian actress
Ellen Nisbeth (born 1987), Swedish violist
Ellen Ochoa (born 1958), American engineer and astronaut
Ellen O'Doherty (1894–1983), Australian religious, superior general of Sisters of Charity
Ellen Osiier (1890–1962), Danish Olympic fencing foil champion
Ellen Page, former name of Elliot Page (born 1987), Canadian actor
Ellen Pao (born 1970), American lawyer, former CEO of Reddit
Ellen Perez (1868–1954), Australian tennis player
Ellen Petri (born 1982), Belgian beauty pageant
Ellen Pompeo (born 1969), American actress
 Ellen Preis (Ellen Müller-Preis) (1912–2007), German-born Austrian Olympic champion foil fencer
Ellen Alida Rose (1843–1???), American agriculturist, suffragist
Ellen Swallow Richards (1842–1911), American industrial and environmental chemist
Ellen Roche (born 1979), Brazilian actress and model
Ellen Roosevelt (1868–1954), American tennis player
Ellen Sauerbrey (born 1937), American politician
Ellen Browning Scripps (1836–1932), American journalist and philanthropist
Ellen Johnson Sirleaf (born 1938), President of Liberia
Ellen Tauscher (born 1951), American politician, Under Secretary of State
Ellen Terry (1847–1928), English stage actress
Ellen Travolta (born 1940), American actress
Ellen von Unwerth (born 1954), German photographer and director, 
Ellen Van Loy (born 1980), Belgian cyclo-cross cyclist
Ellen Venker (born 1983), Dutch softball player
Ellen Vogel (1922–2015), Dutch actress
Ellen Voorhees, American computer scientist
Ellen van der Weijden-Bast (born 1971), Dutch water polo player
Ellen G. White (1827–1915), American co-founder of the Seventh-day Adventist Church and author
Ellen Willmott (1858–1934), English horticulturalist
Ellen Axson Wilson (1860–1914), American first lady 
Ellen Whitmore (1828–1861), American educator and missionary 
Ellen Wilson (born 1976), American judoka
Ellen Woglom (born 1987), American actress
Ellen van Wolde (born 1954), Dutch biblical scholar
Ellen Wong (born 1985), Canadian actress
Ellen Taaffe Zwilich (born 1939), American classical music composer
Ellen Urbani (born 1969), American author

Fictional characters
 Ellen, a character in the 2000 American fantasy-comedy TV movie Life-Size
 Ellen, a character in the American TV sitcom Will & Grace
 Ellen Foxworthy, a fictional character in the webcomic Schlock Mercenary
 Ellen Powell, a character in the American sitcom television series Charles in Charge
 Ellen Ripley, a character in the Alien film series

See also
Elen (disambiguation)
Ellen (disambiguation)
Eleni (given name)
Elín (disambiguation)
Helene (disambiguation)
Helena (disambiguation)
Helen (disambiguation)

Dutch feminine given names
English feminine given names
Estonian feminine given names
Swedish feminine given names